"PGP" is a song by French artist Booba released in 2019. The song reached number one on the French Singles Chart.

Charts

References

2019 singles
2019 songs
French-language songs
SNEP Top Singles number-one singles
Song recordings produced by Cubeatz
Songs written by Tim Gomringer
Songs written by Kevin Gomringer